Kilukkampetti (കിലുക്കാംപെട്ടി) is a 1991 Indian Malayalam-language comedy-drama film directed by Shaji Kailas and written by Rajan Kiriyath and Vinu Kiriyath from a story by Kailas. It stars Jayaram and Suchitra Krishnamoorthi, and also features Shamili, Jagathy Sreekumar, Sai Kumar, and Innocent in significant roles. The film was a box office success.

The film is loosely based on the 1990 made-for-TV film The Maid. The film was remade in Telugu as Joker (1993) and in Hindi as Pyaar Impossible! (2010).

Plot 
Prakash Menon (Jayaram) is a successful architect based in Thiruvananthapuram, Kerala. His company's Kochi branch was not doing well and the company relocated him to Kochi to improve things. He was supposed to replace his equivalent in Kochi named Anu Pillai (Suchitra Krishnamoorthi). Anu is not happy about the company's decision: She does not want to move out of Kochi and she objects. Prakash in turn comes to Kochi, understands the office situation, and decides to talk to Anu in person.

Anu is living with her eight-year-old child Chikkumol (Baby Shamili). She is very naughty and Anu is not able to get a caretaker as no one is able to handle her. Prakash falls in love with Anu after seeing her in a shopping mall. He finds from his friend Mukundan that Anu is in search of a caretaker. Prakash reaches Anu's home and takes up the job under the name of Vasudevan with the intention of getting her to love him.

What follows is funny situations where Prakash has to take care of the girl, cook for the family and kids, and hide himself from those at his office. Eventually Anu goes to Prakash's house to request him not to take charge in Kochi and, on seeing him, understands that he had tricked her. But Prakash resigns from his job and appears to have gone back to Thiruvananthapuram. Anu starts to understand his love and feels sad. But on reaching her home, she finds that Prakash is back again as Vasudevan. Thus the movie ends on a happy note.

Cast 
Jayaram as Prakash Menon / Vasudevan
Suchitra Krishnamoorthi as Anu Pillai
Jagathy Sreekumar as Mukundan
Baby Shamili as Chikkumol
Sai Kumar as Raju
Innocent as Scariah
K. P. A. C. Lalitha as Saramma
Janardanan as Managing Director
Bahadoor as Muthachan
Shyama as Anu's Friend
Bobby Kottarakkara as Laser
Thrissur Elsy as Padmini
Subhash Gopinath Prakash's friend
Beena Antony - Cameo in song 
Suvarna Mathew - Cameo in song

Soundtrack

References

External links 

1991 films
1990s Malayalam-language films
Films directed by Shaji Kailas
Malayalam films remade in other languages